Calliroe is a melodramma eroico or opera in 2 acts and 23 scenes by composer Giuseppe Farinelli. The work uses an Italian language libretto by Gaetano Rossi. The work premiered at La Fenice in Venice on 3 January 1808 in a double bill with the house premiere of Urbano Garzia's ballet Il calunniatore punito ossia Il conte Lenosse.

Roles

References

Operas
1808 operas
Operas based on classical mythology
Italian-language operas
Operas by Giuseppe Farinelli
Opera world premieres at La Fenice
Libretti by Gaetano Rossi